CTI Records (Creed Taylor Incorporated) is a jazz record label founded in 1967 by Creed Taylor. CTI was a subsidiary of A&M before becoming independent in 1970. Its first album was A Day in the Life by guitarist Wes Montgomery in 1967. The final release, by the CTI Jazz All-Star Band, was recorded live at the Montreux Jazz Festival in 2009, and released in November 2010 on multiple formats: CD, DVD and Blu-ray.

Its roster included George Benson, Ron Carter, Eumir Deodato, Astrud Gilberto, Freddie Hubbard, Bob James, Antonio Carlos Jobim, Hubert Laws, Stanley Turrentine, and Walter Wanderley.

History
Don Sebesky created many of the arrangements for CTI and its subsidiary labels. He was later joined by Bob James and then David Matthews in the mid-1970s. Taylor used Van Gelder Studio in Englewood Cliffs, New Jersey, with Rudy Van Gelder engineering nearly all sessions until the later years of the label. Sessions included Ron Carter, Eric Gale, Herbie Hancock, Bob James, Richard Tee, Billy Cobham, Jack DeJohnette, Steve Gadd, Idris Muhammad, and Harvey Mason.

CTI was commercially successful with certain albums well-received by critics. CTI's best-selling album was Deodato's Prelude, which reached No. 3 on the US Billboard albums chart in 1973. A single from the album, "Also Sprach Zarathustra (2001)", peaked at No. 2 on the US Billboard Hot 100 and No. 7 in the UK. Other successful singles were Bob James' "Feel Like Making Love" and "Westchester Lady", Idris Muhammad's "Could Heaven Ever Be Like This", and Esther Phillips' "What a Diff'rence a Day Makes", a disco hit.

Successful album releases included Grover Washington, Jr.'s Mister Magic and Feels So Good (both reaching No. 10 in 1975), Esther Phillips' What a Diff'rence a Day Makes (reaching No. 32 in 1975), and Bob James' BJ4 (reaching No. 38 in 1977).

Taylor's productions for CTI helped to establish smooth jazz as a commercially viable musical genre. CTI also became known for its striking album sleeve designs, most of them with images by photographer Pete Turner.

After founding CTI as a jazz label for A & M Records in 1967, Taylor decided to go independent three years later. The company had several subsidiary labels. Kudu Records was established in 1971 and concentrated on soul jazz with albums by Joe Beck, Hank Crawford, Grant Green, Idris Muhammad, Esther Phillips, Johnny "Hammond" Smith, Dr. Lonnie Smith, and Grover Washington Jr. Salvation Records released 10 albums during its existence, including music by Airto, Roland Hanna, Faith Howard, New York Jazz Quartet, Johnny "Hammond" Smith, and Gábor Szabó Greenestreet (which released albums by Jack Wilkins, Claudio Roditi, Les McCann) and Three Brothers (with recordings by The Clams, Lou Christie, Duke Jones, and Cassandra Morgan).

A switch to Motown Records for distribution was to end in difficulties in 1977, with legal and financial problems eventually leading to the label filing for bankruptcy in 1978. CTI, though, remained active until 1984, releasing studio albums by Ray Barretto, Urszula Dudziak, Jim Hall, Roland Hanna, Nina Simone, and the all-star studio band Fuse One

Taylor restructured CTI in 1989, resuming his association with Van Gelder and Turner in June 1989 when recording the all-star session for Rhythmstick, an ambitious album released on vinyl, CD, VHS, and LaserDisc in 1990. Many young musicians were signed to the label, such as Charles Fambrough, Jim Beard, Ted Rosenthal, Bill O'Connell, Donald Harrison, Steve Laury, and Jurgen Friedrich, as well as veteran guitarist Larry Coryell, who collaborated with arranger Don Sebesky on the best-selling Fallen Angel album, which reached No. 18 in the Billboard Top Contemporary Jazz Albums Chart in 1993.

CTI's post-A&M Records catalog (albums released between 1970 and 1979) is owned by Sony and distributed by Masterworks Jazz in the USA. King Records handles the rights for exclusive distribution in Japan. Grover Washington, Jr.'s Kudu albums have been re-issued by Motown and its MoJazz imprint as part of Universal Classics & Jazz. Bob James owns the four albums he recorded for CTI (now managed by Evolution Music Group under license from Tappan Zee, James' record label). Seawind also owns their back catalog of CTI releases. CTI's A&M-subsidiary releases are distributed by Verve, a division of Universal Music Group.

In 2009, Taylor produced a reissue series of twenty CTI titles remastered by Van Gelder for release on SHM-CD format in Japan. New liner notes were provided by Ira Gitler, Arnaldo DeSouteiro, and Doug Payne. Other reissue series came out in December 2013 (including forty titles released on Blu-spec CD format) and in December 2017 with another forty titles on the CTI 50th Anniversary Collection.

Discography

3000 Series
The albums comprising the CTI 3000 Series were produced by Creed Taylor between 1967 and 1970 and issued by A&M with a "CTI" logo on the front cover.

1000 Series
In 1970, Creed Taylor established CTI independently of A&M and issued the first five releases as the 1000 Series which had a green record label. The 1000 Series featured artists working outside of the jazz genre.

6000 series
The albums in the CTI 6000 series were released between 1970 and 1976 and featured an orange CTI label with black print, but Quadraphonic issues featured a red label variant. Later albums in the 6000 series were distributed by Motown and are designated by the addition of an S1 to the catalog number.

CTI Twofer series
The albums in the CTI Twofer series were double albums released between 1972 and 1974,.

5000 Series
The 5000 Series was introduced in 1975 as a series of popular music recordings and consist of eight issued albums.  Only a handful in this series were produced by Creed Taylor; outside producers handled the rest, like Harvey Mason producing Seawind's albums and David Grusin and Larry Rosen producing Patti Austin's second album.  The first releases features a "P.S." (which stood for "Pop Series") inside the familiar CTI logo.

7000 Series
The 7000 Series continued the numbering sequence from the 6000 Series after it ended its distribution deal with Motown.

8000 Series
The 8000 series was launched in the late-1970s.  Its purpose was to reissue previous CTI and Kudu albums.  In some instances original album titles were  changed, and artwork was also altered, with releases originally issued in gatefold album covers now reduced to single sleeves.

9000 Series
The 9000 Series was started in 1980 and was distributed by CBS Records but maintained its independence (except for Patti Austin's Body Language album which carried a CBS-style look and catalog number)  The series started with the classic orange label (used since the 6000 Series) but by 1981 switched to a white label with a new logo design, though in 1983, for George Benson's archive release Pacific Fire it had a silver label.

Kudu 
The Kudu label was started by Creed Taylor in July 1971 and specialized in soul jazz, releasing 39 albums from 1971 to 1979.  Kudu is considered CTI's sister label.

Salvation 
Salvation Records was a CTI subsidiary originally intended for gospel albums but after releasing one album by the B. C. & M. Choir and laying fallow for two years the label was revived for a handful of jazz and R&B releases.  While Creed Taylor did produce the B. C. & M. Choir album, outside producers would handle the other releases.

Three Brothers label
Three Brothers Records was a short-lived subsidiary of CTI named after Creed Taylor's sons (Creed Jr., John, and Blake). It had a few single releases and issued one album by Lou Christie.

References

External links
CTI Records
Creed Taylor 19-part interview at JazzWax
 

American record labels
American jazz record labels
Jazz record labels
Record labels established in 1967
Record labels disestablished in 1992
American companies established in 1967
American companies disestablished in 1992